Myron Spaulding (October 28, 1905 – September 11, 2000) was an American sailor, yacht designer and builder and concert violinist in Sausalito, California.

Life
Myron Spaulding was well known on the Sausalito waterfront in the mid and late 1900s, and exerted a strong influence on San Francisco Bay sailors during the days when boats were made of wood and built locally by expert craftsmen. An accomplished concert violinist, Myron Spaulding performed professionally for many years, including with the San Francisco Symphony. It was, however, as a sailboat designer, builder and sailor, that Spaulding left his mark on the Bay Area.

Spaulding moved to San Francisco, California as a boy in 1915. He received his credential in naval architecture and boatbuilding from the Polytechnic High School in San Francisco in 1923, and designed and built his first small boat while in school. It was there that he earned an additional degree in music, playing the violin. Following graduation, Spaulding played violin in the Fox Theatre's vaudeville orchestra, for silent movie houses, for the ballet, and eventually earned a seat with the San Francisco Symphony and performed with them until 1957. At the same time, he was racing and winning several class championships in the Bird class, Stars and 6-Meters. He also participated in six TransPacific races from San Francisco to Honolulu. The highlight of his racing career was winning the 1936 TransPac as skipper of the famous Sparkman & Stephens-designed  yawl Dorade. Spaulding opened a naval architecture office in San Francisco before World War II. His first significant design was the  Clipper. In addition to the Clipper class, he created the Spaulding 33, which can still be seen on San Francisco Bay, as well as notable custom boats, including the  yawl Suomi and the  yawl Chrysopyle.

During World War II, he worked at the Madden and Lewis Company shipyard in Sausalito building  tow boats and  subchasers, then spent a couple of years as a marine surveyor before leasing property near McNear's Beach in the late 1940s, where he repaired boats, continued with survey work and designed and built the  Buoyant Girl. After losing his lease to make way for development, he returned to Sausalito in 1951 and bought the present waterfront site of Spaulding Boatworks at the foot of Gate Five Road.

Myron Spaulding died in the fall of 2000 at the age of 94. Myron Spaulding's widow, Gladys, died a little more than a year and a half later and left the Spaulding Boatworks in charitable trust, with instructions for the trustees to form a non-profit corporation, named the Spaulding Wooden Boat Center (SWBC). Today, the SWBC is a working and living museum, with the mission to restore and return to active use significant, historic wooden sailing vessels; preserve and enhance its working boatyard; create a place where people can gather to use, enjoy, and learn about wooden boats; and educate others about wooden boat building skills, traditions and values.

Myron Spaulding's design collection is at the San Francisco Maritime National Historic Park.

Boats designed
Nautigal. Custom  sloop. Built in 1938.
Suomi. Custom  yawl. Built in 1947.
Lark III. Custom  sloop.
Buoyant Girl. Custom . Built in 1949. Model of boat is in Commodore's Room at San Francisco Yacht Club in Belvedere, California.
Clipper class  sloops (63 built)
Spaulding 33 (9 built, possibly more)
Chrysopyle Custom  yawl. Built in 1961.
Spaulding 28 (One boat built. Started in 1958 and completed in 2006)

Sailboat races
1936 Transpacific Yacht Race as master and navigator of  yawl Dorade. First, first in class and first overall. (D:H:M:S: Elapsed: 13:07:20:04; Corrected: 11:03:29:44)
Five additional Transpacs as sailing master and/or navigator.
1939 Successfully defended San Francisco Perpetual Trophy. 6-meter Saga of St. Francis Yacht Club in San Francisco defeated 6-meter Rebel of Los Angeles Yacht Club.
1946 Successfully defended San Francisco Perpetual Trophy. 8-meter Hussy of Corinthian Yacht Club in Tiburon defeated the  sloop Amorita of Newport Harbor Yacht Club.

Reputation & legacy

Photos

See also
Spaulding Wooden Boat Center
List of sailboat designers and manufacturers
Yacht racing
Sausalito, California

References

Further reading
Maguire, Matt. "Myron Spaulding, Navigating Through the Years", InMarin, Volume 3, Issue 11, December 1991, pp. 12–18
Sausalito Historical Society. Sausalito (Images of America). San Francisco: Arcadia Publishing, 2005. 
Tracy, Jack. Sausalito Moments in Time: A Pictorial History of Sausalito 1850-1950. Sausalito:Windgate Press 1983. Roana Spaulding 1992.

External links
Spaulding Wooden Boat Center
San Francisco Maritime National Historic Park

1905 births
2000 deaths
American boat builders
American classical violinists
Male classical violinists
American male violinists
American male sailors (sport)
People from Sausalito, California
People from Eureka, California
American yacht designers
20th-century American architects
20th-century classical violinists
20th-century American male musicians
20th-century American violinists